King's Crossing is an American nighttime soap opera which aired on ABC from January 16 to February 27, 1982 on Saturday night at 8:00pm for seven episodes.

Its roots can be found in the 1980 drama Secrets of Midland Heights, which aired on CBS for eight episodes. When that show was canceled, Lorimar Productions announced it would return in a retooled format; King's Crossing was a completely different show, but employed several actors (including Doran Clark, Linda Hamilton, Marilyn Jones, and Daniel Zippi) who had also appeared in the earlier drama.

The show centered on the Hollister family relocating to King's Crossing, California. The father, Paul (Bradford Dillman), was a recovering alcoholic who was hoping for a fresh start with his family and career as an English professor at the town's college. His long-suffering wife Nan (Mary Frann) was also trying to re-establish a connection with her cold and distant Aunt Louisa Beauchamp (Beatrice Straight), who had never approved of Paul. Nan and Paul had two teenage daughters: Lauren (Hamilton), an aspiring pianist who fell into an affair with her piano teacher, symphony conductor Jonathan Hadary (Michael Zaslow), and Carey (Jones), a student curious about Aunt Louisa and family secrets. One of those secrets involved a mysterious person hidden away in an attic room; that person turned out to be their crippled cousin Jillian (Clark). Carey tried to restore Jillian's confidence and draw her further into the family, much to Aunt Louisa's consternation. Louisa's attempts to hide family secrets and the true story behind Jillian's accident were not revealed before the show was canceled.

Cast
Bradford Dillman as Paul Hollister
Mary Frann as Nan Hollister
Linda Hamilton as Lauren Hollister 
Marilyn Jones as Carey Hollister 
Daniel Zippi as Billy McCall 
Doran Clark as Jillian Beauchamp
Beatrice Straight as Louisa Beauchamp 
Dorothy Meyer as Willa Bristol

Episodes

References
 
Mary Ann Copeland, Soap Opera History, Mallard Press, 1991

External links
 

1982 American television series debuts
1982 American television series endings
American television soap operas
Television shows set in California
American Broadcasting Company original programming
English-language television shows
Television series by Lorimar Television